Himalayana is a genus of spiders in the family Oonopidae. It was first described in 2014 by Grismado. , it contains 6 species from India and Nepal.

Species
Himalayana comprises the following species:
Himalayana andreae Grismado, 2014
Himalayana castanopsis Grismado, 2014
Himalayana kathmandu Grismado, 2014
Himalayana martensi Grismado, 2014
Himalayana parbat Grismado, 2014
Himalayana siliwalae Grismado, 2014

References

Oonopidae
Araneomorphae genera
Spiders of Asia